Vilne is a village in the Mohyliv-Podilskyi Raion of Vinnytsia Oblast, Ukraine. It belongs to the Mohyliv-Podilskyi urban hromada.

Demographics
Native language as of the Ukrainian Census of 2001:
 Ukrainian 100%

References

Mohyliv-Podilskyi Raion
Villages in Mohyliv-Podilskyi Raion